Weslley Smith Alves Feitosa (born 21 April 1992), commonly known simply as Weslley, is a Brazilian footballer who plays as a forward.

External links 

1992 births
Living people
Association football forwards
Brazilian footballers
Brazilian expatriate footballers
Brazilian expatriate sportspeople in South Korea
Expatriate footballers in South Korea
Expatriate footballers in Japan
Sport Club Corinthians Paulista players
Clube Atlético Linense players
Jeonnam Dragons players
Gangwon FC players
Busan IPark players
Weslley Smith Alves Feitosa
Shonan Bellmare players
K League 1 players
J1 League players
Sportspeople from Piauí